Antonique is a given name that is an variant of Antoinette and Antonia. Notable people known by that name include the following:

Given name
Antonique Smith (born 1983), American actress and singer

Middle name
Jonielle Antonique Smith, full name of Jonielle Smith (born 30 January 1996) is a Jamaican sprinter

See also

Anthonique Strachan